This article presents two lists of  Nigerian states by Human Development Index (HDI), including the Federal Capital Territory. The first list from the Radboud University Nijmegen ranks the states by the international HDI-methology. The second list ranks the states by an own methology from the United Nations Development Programme.

List (2019 data, Radboud University) 
Nigerian states by Human Development Index as of 2021, including the Federal Capital Territory.

List (2016, UNDP) 
Nigerian states by Human Development Index as of 2016, including the Federal Capital Territory.

References 

Ranked lists of country subdivisions
Human Development Index
Economy of Nigeria-related lists
Nigeria, HDI